Epicephalites is a perisphictid ammonite, included in the subfamily Aulacostephaninae, from the Upper Jurassic of New Zealand and Mexico, related to Involuticeras. Its shell is involute, whorls inflated with a deep umbilicus. The outer half including the venter is ribbed, the inner half is smooth.

References

 Treatise on Invertebrate Paleontology, Part L (1957), Mesozoic Ammonoidea. p. 327.

Jurassic ammonites
Ammonitida genera
Perisphinctidae
Fossils of Mexico